Ratnangi (pronounced ratnāngi, meaning the one with a gem-like body) is a rāgam in Carnatic music (musical scale of South Indian classical music). It is the 2nd melakarta rāgam (parent scale) in the 72 melakarta rāgam system of Carnatic music. It is called Phenadhyuti in Muthuswami Dikshitar school of Carnatic music.

Structure and Lakshana

It is the 2nd rāgam in the 1st chakra Indu. The mnemonic name is Indu-Sri. The mnemonic phrase is sa ri ga ma pa dha ni. Its  structure (ascending and descending scale) is as follows (see swaras in Carnatic music for details on below notation and terms):
: 
: 

The scale uses the notes shuddha rishabham, shuddha gandharam, shuddha madhyamam, shuddha dhaivatham and  kaisiki nishadham. As it is a melakarta rāgam, by definition it is a sampoorna rāgam (has all seven notes in ascending and descending scale). It is the shuddha madhyamam equivalent of Jalārnavam, which is the 38th melakarta scale.

Asampurna Melakarta 
Phenadhyuti is the 2nd Melakarta in the original list compiled by Venkatamakhin. The notes used in the scale are the same, but the ascending scale is different.
: 
:

Janya rāgams 
Ratnangi has a few minor janya rāgams (derived scales) associated with it, of which Revati is very popular. See List of janya rāgams for full list of scales associated with Ratnangi.

Compositions
Here are a few common compositions sung in concerts, set to Ratnangi.
Kalasavardhijam by Thyagaraja
Tarunam ide by Koteeswara Iyer
Sree Gurum Chintayaamyaham by Dr. M. Balamuralikrishna
Janani Ashrita by Harikeshanallur Muthaiah Bhagavatar
Varnam -Niratamu - from Janaka Raga Varna Manjari by Nallan Chakravarthy Murthy

The following composition is set to Phenadhyuti.
Sri Dakshinamurthim by Muthuswami Dikshitar

Related rāgams
This section covers the theoretical and scientific aspect of this rāgam.

Ratnangi's notes, when shifted using Graha bhedam, yield two other melakarta rāgams, namely Gamanashrama and Jhankaradhwani. Graha bhedam is the step taken in keeping the relative note frequencies same, while shifting the shadjam to the next note in the rāgam. For further details and an illustration, refer to Graha bhedam on Ratnangi.

Notes

References

Melakarta ragas